The following teams competed in the men's tournament at the 1936 Summer Olympics.
GK=Goalkeeper
DF=Defender
MF=Midfielder
FW=Forward

Austria
Austria had a squad of 22 players.

Head coach:

Germany
Germany had a squad of 22 players.

Head coach: Otto-Günther Kaundinya

Hungary
The following players represented Hungary.

Head coach:

Romania
The following players represented Romania.

Switzerland
The following players represented Switzerland.

United States
The following players represented the United States.

Playin coach:Willy Renz, Trainer: Fred Brenner, Manager: Dietrich Wortmann & Assistant manager: Walter Mangel

Source: First half & Second half

References

External links
 Olympic Report
 

1936 Summer Olympics
 
Handball at the 1936 Summer Olympics